Battle of Makwanpur was fought on 21 August 1762 in Makwanpurgadhi, Nepal between the Gorkha Kingdom and the Kingdom of Makwanpur. The battle lasted for about eight hours and resulted in Gorkhali victory. 60 Gorkhali soldiers suffered casualties and 400 soldiers died on the side of Makwanpur.

References 

Makwanpur
Gurkhas
Makwanpur
1762 in Nepal
History of Bagmati Province